Elena Santoni (born 30 April 1930) is an Italian gymnast. She competed in the women's artistic team all-around at the 1948 Summer Olympics.

References

External links
 

1930 births
Possibly living people
Italian female artistic gymnasts
Olympic gymnasts of Italy
Gymnasts at the 1948 Summer Olympics